The medley relay events at the 2019 World Para Swimming Championships were held in the London Aquatics Centre at the Queen Elizabeth Olympic Park in London between 9–15 September.

Medalists
* - denotes the swimmer only swam in the heats only.

Results

References

2019 World Para Swimming Championships